This list includes people who have graduated from or otherwise attended Kent State University at the main campus in Kent, Ohio or one of its seven regional campuses in northeastern Ohio.  Kent State counts over 257,000 living alumni as of 2021.  

^ ''attended classes only at the Stark Campus

See also
List of presidents of Kent State University

References

External links
Kent State University Alumni Association

 
Kent State University alumni

|-
|Kyle Craven
|Internet celebrity from the Bad Luck Brian meme
|B.S. Construction Management (2012)
|Entertainment
|-